Siaka Coulibaly (born 10 March 1972) is a Burkinabé footballer. He played in six matches for the Burkina Faso national football team from 1996 to 2005. He was also named in Burkina Faso's squad for the 1996 African Cup of Nations tournament.

References

External links
 

1972 births
Living people
Burkinabé footballers
Burkina Faso international footballers
1996 African Cup of Nations players
Place of birth missing (living people)
Association football goalkeepers
21st-century Burkinabé people
US des Forces Armées players
USM Alger players
Rail Club du Kadiogo players
Étoile Filante de Ouagadougou players
Burkinabé expatriate footballers
Expatriate footballers in Algeria